Irving may refer to:

People
Irving (name), including a list of people with the name

Fictional characters
 Irving, the main character's love interest in Cathy (comic strip)
 Lloyd Irving, the main protagonist in the Tales of Symphonia video game

Places

Canada
 Irving Nature Park, a park in Saint John, N.B.

United States
Irving, California, former name of Irvington, California
Irving, Illinois
Irving, Iowa
Irving (Duluth), Minnesota
Irving, New York
Irving, Texas
Irving, Wisconsin, a town
Irving (community), Wisconsin, an unincorporated community
Irving Park, Chicago, Illinois
 Irving Township, Montgomery County, Illinois
 Irving Township, Michigan
 Irving Township, Minnesota
 Lake Irving, a lake in Minnesota

Companies
 Irving Group of Companies, Canadian conglomerate based in Saint John, New Brunswick, controlled by the Irving family, including:
 J. D. Irving, a conglomerate with holdings in forestry, pulp and paper, tissue, newsprint, building supplies, frozen food, transportation, shipping lines, and ship building, including
Irving Tissue
Irving Shipbuilding
Irving Equipment
Irving Oil
Irving Oil Refinery
 Irving Trust, formerly a large New York bank, merged into Bank of New York in 1988
 Irving (talent agency), talent agency based in Tokyo, Japan

Other uses
 Irving (band), an American indie rock band
 "Irving", World War II Allied code-name for the Japanese Nakajima J1N aircraft
 Operation Irving, a military operation that took place in Vietnam in October 1966
 "Irving", designation for Gekko in the video game Metal Gear Solid 4
 Irving, a magic sword belonging to Joe the Barbarian in Jack Chalker's Dancing Gods series of fantasy novels
"Irving (Jaggered Sixteenths)", the B-side instrumental jazz tune accompanying The Crystals' 1964 A-side hit "All Grown Up"

See also

 
Erving (disambiguation)
Irvine (disambiguation)
Irve (disambiguation)
IRV (disambiguation)